This list contains Muisca and pre-Muisca scholars; researchers, historians, archaeologists, anthropologists and other investigators who have contributed to the current knowledge of the Muisca and their ancestors of the prehistory of the Altiplano Cundiboyacense and of the preceramic and ceramic Herrera Periods.

Other than the Mesoamericanists and scholars of the Incas, Muisca scholars are not too abundant. Most of the early Muisca knowledge comes from the Spanish conquistadores and missionaries working in the Americas. 


List of Muisca and pre-Muisca scholars

See also 

List of Muisca research institutes
Muisca
Mayanist
Inca scholars

References

Bibliography 
 
 
 
 
 
 
 
 
 
 
 
 
 
 
 
 
 
 
 
 
 
 
 
 
 

 
Scholars
Muisca
Muisca